Haig is a settlement in British Columbia. It was named for Douglas Haig, 1st Earl Haig, a British senior officer during the First World War.

References
 

Settlements in British Columbia